Coin Coin Chapter Four: Memphis (or simply just Memphis; sometimes stylized as COIN COIN Chapter Four: Memphis) is the ninth solo studio album by American jazz musician Matana Roberts. It was released via Constellation on October 18, 2019, as CST145. The album is the fourth installment in the proposed 12-part Coin Coin and was preceded by Coin Coin Chapter Three: River Run Thee (2015).

Recording 
Coin Coin Chapter Four: Memphis was recorded at Breakglass Studio, produced by Jace Lasek, with help from Dave Smith. The album was mixed at Hotel2Tango by Radwan Moumneh, and mastered at Grey Market by Harris Newman, with all locations being in Montreal, Canada. While Coin Coin Chapter Three: River Run Thee was created solely by Roberts, Memphis includes contributions from many musicians, most of whom contributing vocals. Roberts sings, performs spoken word, and plays the alto saxophone and clarinet.

Themes 
In Memphis and throughout the Coin Coin series, Roberts explores American and African-American history. Thom Jurek of AllMusic states the album "interrogates official accounts, slave narratives, her family's stories, and her identity as an African American woman." The album was based on a story told by Roberts' grandparents. In the story, a woman's mixed-race parents are murdered by the Ku Klux Klan and she escapes to live in the forest.

Critical reception 

Coin Coin Chapter Four: Memphis received positive reviews from critics. Spectrum Culture Evan Welsh noted "the way in which Roberts approaches identity touches upon the intimate and grand, the historical and folkloric" and expressed his excitement for the next 12 planned installments. Pitchfork Mina Tavakoli provided historical context, saying "Matana Roberts... saw how the tempo of history seemed to move irregularly through both her own memory and the national one". Both Thom Jurek of Allmusic and Winesburgohio of Sputnikmusic mention how the album is not an easy listen, "impossible" to listen to in the background.

Personnel 
Adopted from the listing at cstrecords.com. 
Matana Roberts: alto sax, clarinet, spoken word, vocals
Hannah Marcus: electric guitar, nylon string guitar, fiddle, accordion, vocals
Sam Shalabi: electric guitar, oud, vocals
Nicolas Caloia: double bass, vocals
Ryan Sawyer: drumset, vibraphone, jaw harp, bells, vocals

Guests 
Steve Swell: trombone, vocals
Ryan White: vibraphone
Thierry Amar: vocals
Nadia Moss: vocals
Jessica Moss: vocals
Ian Ilavsky: vocals

Track listing

References

External links 
 Coin Coin Chapter Four: Memphis on Bandcamp

2019 albums
Matana Roberts albums
Constellation Records (Canada) albums
Free jazz albums